The 2013 ANZ Championship season  was the sixth season of the ANZ Championship. The 2013 season began on 24 March and concluded on 14 July. With a team  captained by Natalie von Bertouch and featuring Erin Bell, Carla Borrego, Renae Hallinan, Rebecca Bulley and Sharni Layton, Adelaide Thunderbirds won both the minor premiership and the overall championship. Having previously won the 2010 ANZ Championship, Thunderbirds became the first team to win a second championship.
Thunderbirds secured the minor premiership with a 64–48 win over Northern Mystics in Round 13. They subsequently defeated Melbourne Vixens 49–39 in the major semi-final and	Queensland Firebirds 50–48 in the grand final to win the championship.

Transfers

Notes

Salary cap
In October 2012, Netball New Zealand, the five New Zealand ANZ Championship franchises and the New Zealand Netball Players’ Association agreed  a new collective agreement to take effect for the 2013 ANZ Championship season. This saw introduction of a $380,000 salary cap. Teams were permitted to contract between 12 and 14 players in their squad.

Head coaches and captains

Melbourne Vixens Summer Challenge
The main pre-season event was the Summer Challenge, hosted by Melbourne Vixens at the State Netball Hockey Centre on 23 and 24 February. 
Round 1

Round 2

Round 3

Round 4

Round 5

Round 6

Round 7

Round 8

Regular season

Round 1

Round 2

Round 3

Round 4

Round 5

Round 6

Round 7

Round 8

Round 9

Round 10

Round 11

Round 12

Round 13

Round 14

Final table

Finals

Major semi-final

Minor semi-final

Preliminary final

Grand final

Season statistics

Award winners

ANZ Championship awards

All Star Team

Australian Netball Awards

Media coverage
Netball Australia signed a new TV rights agreement with	Fox Sports and SBS. All 69 games, including the playoffs were broadcast live by Fox Sports. SBS 2, replacing Network 10, broadcast a live Sunday match as well as providing coverage of the playoffs on its free-to-air television network. Sky Sport continued to broadcast live games in New Zealand.

References

 
2013
2013 in New Zealand netball
2013 in Australian netball